Buhweju District is a district in Western Uganda. It is one of the districts that constitute the Ankole sub-region. Its 'chief town', is Nsiika.

Location
Buhweju District is bordered by Rubirizi District to the west and northwest, Ibanda District to the northeast, Mbarara District to the east, Sheema District to the southeast, and Bushenyi District to the southwest. The coordinates of the district are:00°20'40.0"S, 30°25'00.0"E (Latitude:-0.344444; Longitude:30.416667).

Overview
Buhweju District was carved out of Bushenyi District in July 2010. The district is part of Ankole sub-region, home to an estimated 2.56 million people in 2014, according to the national census conducted that year. Districts that constitute Ankole sub-region include the following:

 Buhweju District
 Bushenyi District
 Ibanda District
 Isingiro District
 Kiruhura District
 Mbarara District
 Mitooma District
 Ntungamo District
 Rubirizi District
 Sheema District

Population
The national census in 1991 estimated the district population at about 55,540. In 2002, the national census conducted that year put the population of the district at approximately 82,900. In August 2014, the national population census and housing survey enumerated the population in the district at 120,720.

Natural resources
Buhweju District has proven reserves of gold, lime, copper, and timber.

See also

References

External links
   Buhweju District Homepage
 Satellite Map of Buhweju District At Maplandia.com

 
Ankole sub-region
Districts of Uganda
Western Region, Uganda